Abū al-Ṭayyib Aḥmad ibn al-Ḥusayn al-Mutanabbī al-Kindī (– 23 September 965 AD) from Kufa, Abbasid Caliphate, was a famous Abbasid-era Arab poet at the court of the Hamdanid emir Sayf al-Dawla in Aleppo, and for whom he composed 300 folios of poetry. His poetic style earned him great popularity in his time and many of his poems are not only still widely read in today's Arab world but are considered to be proverbial.

He started writing poetry when he was nine years old. He is well known for his sharp intelligence and wittiness. Among the topics he discussed were courage, the philosophy of life, and the description of battles. As one of the greatest, most prominent and influential poets in the Arabic language, much of his work has been translated into over 20 languages worldwide.

His great talent brought him very close to many leaders of his time, whom he extolled in return for money and gifts. His political ambitions, however, ultimately soured his relations with his patrons and his egomania may have cost him his life when the subjects of some of his verse attacked him.

Childhood and youth
Al-Mutanabbi was born in the Iraqi city of Kufah in 915. His father claimed descent from the South Arabian tribe of Banu Ju'fa. His last name, Al-Kindī, was attributed to the district he was born.

Owing to his poetic talent, and claiming predecession of prophet Saleh, al-Mutanabbi received an education in Damascus, Syria. When Shi'ite Qarmatians sacked Kufah in 924, he joined them and lived among the Banu Kalb and other Bedouin tribes. Learning their doctrines and dialect, he had many followers, and even claimed to be a Nabi (Prophet)—hence the name Al-Mutanabbi ("The Would-be Prophet").

He led a Qarmatian revolt in Syria in 932. After its suppression and two years of imprisonment by the Ikhshid governor  of Hims, he recanted in 935 and became a wandering poet. During this period he began writing his first known poems. Political ambition to be a Wali led al-Mutanabbi to the courts of Sayf al-Dawla and Abu al-Misk Kafur but in this ambition he failed.

Al-Mutanabbi and Sayf al-Dawla
Al-Mutanabbi lived at the time when the Abbasid Caliphate started coming apart and many of the states in the Islamic world became politically and militarily independent. Chief among those states was the Emirate of Aleppo.

He began to write panegyrics in the tradition established by the poets Abu Tammam and al-Buhturi. In 948 he joined the court of Sayf al-Dawla, the Hamdanid poet-prince of northern Syria. Sayf al-Dawla was greatly concerned with fighting the Byzantine Empire in Asia minor, where Al-Mutanabbi fought alongside him. During his nine years stay at Sayf al-Dawla's court, Al-Mutanabbi wrote his greatest and most famous poems, panegyrics in praise of his patron that rank as masterpieces of Arabic poetry.

During his stay in Aleppo, Al-Mutanabbi found himself at odds with many scholars and poets in Sayf al-Dawla's court, including Abu Firas al-Hamdani, a poet and Sayf al-Dawla's cousin. In addition, Al-Mutanabbi lost Sayf al-Dawla's favor because of his political ambition to be Wāli. The latter part of this period was clouded with intrigues and jealousies that culminated in al-Mutanabbi's leaving Syria for Egypt, then ruled in name by the Ikhshidids.

Al-Mutanabbi in Egypt
Al-Mutanabbi joined the court of Abu al-Misk Kafur after parting ways with Saif al Dawla. Kafur mistrusted Al-Mutanabbi's intentions, claiming them to be a threat to his position. Al-Mutanabbi realized that his hopes of becoming a statesman were not going to bear fruit and he left Egypt in c. 960. After he left, he heavily criticized Abu al-Misk Kafur with satirical odes.

Poetry and famous sayings
Mutanabbi's egomaniacal nature seems to have got him in trouble several times and might be why he was killed. This can be seen in his poetry, which is often conceited:
 In a famous poem he speaks to the power of identity and the freedom that comes with knowing oneself.

 He was also known to have said:

Death
Al-Mutanabbi was killed because one of his poems contained a great insult to a man called "Ḍabbah al-Asadī". Dabbah, along with his uncle Fātik al-Asadī, managed to intercept al-Mutanabbi, his son Muḥassad, and his servant near Baghdad in 965. Ibn Rachik reported that when al-Mutanabbi had the chance to flee, the attackers recited some of the bold verses he wrote relating to courage, and he was forced to live up to them; he stayed and fought, and died along with his companions.

Legacy

Ibn Jinni the grammarian (c. 941/2—1001/2) wrote a commentary on Mutanabbi's poetry titled Al-Fasr ('The Explanation').
The poet philosopher Abu Al Alaa al-Marri has also written a book of exegesis on Al-Mutanabbi's poetry. Al Marri, himself an accomplished poet, would usually refer to Al-Mutannabi affectionately as "our poet".
Encyclopedia Britannica states: "He gave to the traditional qaṣīdah, or ode, a freer and more personal development, writing in what can be called a neoclassical style that combined some elements of Iraqi and Syrian stylistics with classical features."

Notes

References

Bibliography

Al-Khalil, S. and Makiya, K., The Monument: Art, Vulgarity, and Responsibility in Iraq, University of California Press, 1991, p. 74.
 Al-Mutanabbî, Le Livre des Sabres, choix de poèmes, présentation et traduction de Hoa Hoï Vuong & Patrick Mégarbané, Actes Sud, Sindbad, novembre 2012.
 Arberry, A. J. (trans.), Poems of al-Mutanabbi: A Selection with Introduction, Translations and Notes (London: Cambridge University Press, 1967).

 Wormhoudt, Arthur (trans.), The Diwan of Abu Tayyib Ahmad Ibn Al-Husayn Al-Mutanabbi (Kazi 2002)

See also
 Safa Khulusi

External links

 

 Al-Mutanabbi The Greatest Arabic Poet
 Mutanabbi's poetry recited by Samar Traboulsi
 Almotanabbi.com - the complete collection of Mutanabbi's poems along with explanation
 

910s births
965 deaths
Year of birth uncertain
10th-century Arabic poets
Poets from the Abbasid Caliphate
People from Kufa
People from the Hamdanid emirate of Aleppo
Qarmatians
Sayf al-Dawla